Hecistopteris pinnatifida is a fern species in the Vittarioideae subfamily of the Pteridaceae. It is endemic to Ecuador.  Its natural habitat is subtropical or tropical moist lowland forests. It is threatened by habitat loss.

References

Pteridaceae
Ferns of Ecuador
Endemic flora of Ecuador
Ferns of the Americas
Vulnerable flora of South America
Taxonomy articles created by Polbot